The Montgomerie River is a river in the Buller District of New Zealand's South Island. The river's entire length is within Victoria Forest Park.

See also
List of rivers of New Zealand

References

Rivers of the West Coast, New Zealand
Rivers of New Zealand